Fenessa Pineda is an American-Mexican actress. She is best known for Rambo: Last Blood (2019), Mosquita y Mari (2012) and Sin Cielo (2018).

Career
Pineda made her acting debut in 2005, she appeared in an episode of Girlfriends. She made her feature film debut in 2006, she played a 2nd Grade Girl in You, Me and Dupree. In 2012 she appeared in the 2012 coming-of-age film Mosquita y Mari. In 2019, she appeared in the American action film Rambo: Last Blood, she received a Golden Raspberry Award nomination for Worst Supporting Actress.

Filmography

Film

Television

Awards

References

External links
 

Living people
Year of birth missing (living people)
American emigrants to Mexico